Nebraska Highway 35 is a highway in the northeastern part of the U.S. state of Nebraska.  It has a western terminus in Norfolk at U.S. Highway 275 and Nebraska Highway 24 and an eastern terminus at U.S. Highway 77 and U.S. Highway 75 at Dakota City.  The highway serves as a connector between Norfolk and Sioux City, Iowa.

Route description
Nebraska Highway 35 begins in the southeastern portion of Norfolk at US 275 and NE 24.  It goes north on an old alignment of US 275 briefly, then turns northeast to go out of Norfolk into farmland.  It passes through Hoskins, then goes due east.  It makes a 90 degree turn north, passes by Winside, then turns east again at an intersection with Nebraska Highway 98.  It continues east through Wayne, then at an intersection with Nebraska Highway 16, turns north again.  It passes through Wakefield, then turns east at an intersection with Nebraska Highway 9.  The two highways overlap for several miles, then when NE 9 separates, NE 35 goes northeasterly.  It passes through Hubbard, then turns east and ends at a four way stop on the southwestern edge of Dakota City at an intersection with U.S. Highway 75 and U.S. Highway 77.

Major intersections

References

External links

Nebraska Roads: NE 21-40

035
Transportation in Madison County, Nebraska
Transportation in Stanton County, Nebraska
Transportation in Wayne County, Nebraska
Transportation in Dixon County, Nebraska
Transportation in Dakota County, Nebraska